The teal emo skink (Emoia cyanogaster) is a species of lizard in the family Scincidae. The species is found throughout Oceania.

Habitat

Reproduction
E. cyanogaster is oviparous.

References

Further reading
Lesson R-P (1830). "Description de quelques reptiles nouveaux ou peu connus ". pp. 34–65. 'In: Deperrey LI (1830). Voyage autour du Monde, Exécuté par Ordre du Roi, Sur la Corvette de La Majesté, La Coquille, pendant les années 1822, 1823, 1824 et 1825 ... Zoologie, Tome Second, 1re Partie. Paris: Arthus Bertrand. 471 pp. (Scincus cyanogaster, new species, pp. 47–48 + Plate III, figure 4). (in French).
Smith MA (1937). "A Review of the Genus Lygosoma (Scincidae: Reptilia) and its Allies". Records of the Indian Museum 39' (3): 213–234. (Emoia cyanogaster'', new combination, p. 227).

Emoia
Reptiles described in 1830
Taxa named by René Lesson